Kloner is a surname. Notable people with the surname include: 

Amos Kloner (1940–2019), Israeli archaeologist
Hymie Kloner (1929–2010), South African footballer

See also
Kloser